Sang Guowei (born November 1941 in Wuxing, Zhejiang) is a Chinese pharmacologist, physician and politician. He graduated from Shanghai Medical College and was elected an academician of the Chinese Academy of Engineering. He served as the chairman of the Chinese Peasants' and Workers' Democratic Party, a recognized minor political party in China, and was a Vice Chairman of the Standing Committee of the National People's Congress between 2008 and 2013.

References

1941 births
Living people
Scientists from Huzhou
People's Republic of China politicians from Zhejiang
Vice Chairpersons of the National People's Congress
Members of the Chinese Academy of Engineering
Political office-holders in Zhejiang
Chinese Peasants' and Workers' Democratic Party politicians
Fudan University alumni
Chinese pharmacologists
Physicians from Zhejiang